The Ethiopia women's national volleyball team represents Ethiopia in international women's volleyball competitions and friendly matches.

The team qualified for the 1991 and 1993 events of the Women's African Volleyball Championship.

References
Ethiopia Volleyball Federation

National women's volleyball teams
Volleyball
Volleyball in Ethiopia
Women's sport in Ethiopia